Trentepohlia jolithus is an alga species in the genus Trentepohlia. It  has been reported in subaerial habitats from Spain.

References

Trentepohliaceae